Wasabi-No-Ginger is a fictional superhero appearing in American comic books published by Marvel Comics. Created by writer Chris Claremont and artist David Nakayama, he first appeared in Big Hero 6 #1 (September 2008), a book about a titular superhero team in which Wasabi is a member.

Wasabi appears in the 2014 Disney animated film Big Hero 6 voiced by Damon Wayans Jr., with Khary Payton taking over in the television series and the video game Kingdom Hearts III. This version of him is black and is a smart neurotic neat freak. He also uses plasma blades to help protect the city.

Publication history
The character was created by Chris Claremont and David Nakayama and first appeared in Big Hero 6 #1 (September 2008). He along with Fredzilla were meant to serve as replacements for then current members Sunpyre and Ebon Samurai.

Fictional character biography

Wasabi-No-Ginger is a trained chef and a member of Big Hero 6. His first mission with the six was taking on a villain named Badgal and her three minions; Whiplash, Brute and Gunsmith. He is once again with his teammates, this time helping Spider-Man take out Doctor Octopus' satellites. Wasabi and Baymax jump head on into battle, taking on Everwraith.

Powers and abilities
Wasabi-No-Ginger uses various swords to fight. He can also give form to his Qi-Energy, usually materializing it as throwing knives that can paralyze opponents.

Reception 
 In 2020, CBR.com ranked Wasabi-No-Ginger 10th in their "Marvel Comics: Ranking Every Member Of Big Hero 6 From Weakest To Most Powerful" list.

In other media

Film

Wasabi-No-Ginger, renamed Wasabi, appears in the 2014 animated film Big Hero 6, voiced by Damon Wayans Jr. In the film, the character is black, and is depicted as a smart, slightly neurotic, heavily built neat-freak and an expert on laser cutting at the San Fransokyo Institute of Technology. In addition, according to himself, his name is a nickname that Fred gave him after he spilled wasabi on his shirt one time. On the character, co-director Chris Williams said "He's actually the most conservative, cautious—he [sic] the most normal among a group of brazen characters. So he really grounds the movie in the second act and becomes, in a way, the voice of the audience and points out that what they're doing is crazy."

Wasabi spends the majority of the movie following the rules and living almost in fear as he states, "There's a place for everything and everything's in its place." As the film progresses, he becomes slightly braver and learns to deal with the craziness of being a superhero. He appears to be the most protective of Hiro most likely due to his brotherly friendship with Tadashi. Wasabi wears a green armor suit that was built by Hiro that generates plasma blades from the wrists of the suit.

Television
Wasabi appears in Big Hero 6: The Series, with the character voiced by Khary Payton. In the first episode, "Baymax Returns", Wasabi's sudden change from pessimistic to courageous during battle is explained by the fact that he gets a high off of adrenaline. Despite his cowardly personality, he is shown to admire other blade related weaponry including ninja-chef Moamakase's despite her trying to use them against him. In "Fred's Bro-Tillion", Wasabi reveals that his father is an Orthodontist. In "Steamer's Revenge", it is revealed he is allergic to dogs. Out of all of his teammates, he has the least in common with Hiro whom he had difficulty with due to his  messiness. By the end of "Killer App", the two become closer. In "Something's Fishy", he reveals that he was full of test anxiety all throughout his time in high school. However, the series also shows moments of him being much more confident and even impressed with certain things. The only villain he does not seem afraid of is Momakase, mostly because of her similar weapons. He was also excited with the fact that not only was his car recovered from the river, but also given various gadgets and upgrades. His car unfortunately, ends up getting knocked into the San Fransokyo Bay again. In "Fear Not", Wasabi begins teaching classes where it is revealed that he suffers from glossophobia. He gets over it by distracting his students with Mini-Max. In the season 2 finale, he graduates SFIT.

Video games
Wasabi makes an appearance along with the rest of Big Hero 6 in Kingdom Hearts III, with Khary Payton reprising his role. He has gained the ability to shoot his blades as projectiles.

References

External links
 Wasabi-No-Ginger at Marvel Wiki
 Wasabi-No-Ginger at Comic Vine

Big Hero 6 characters
Characters created by Chris Claremont
Comics characters introduced in 2008
Fictional chefs
Fictional college students
Fictional kenjutsuka
Fictional pacifists
Fictional swordfighters in comics
Fictional tai chi practitioners
Japanese superheroes
Marvel Comics superheroes
Teenage characters in comics
Teenage superheroes